Bagaha is a city and a municipality in the district of Pashchim Champaran in the state of Bihar, India. It is a subdivision of Pashchim Champaran district and is a Police District.

Demographics
 India census, Bagaha had a population of 112,634. Males constitute 53% of the population and females 47%. Bagaha has an average literacy rate of 38%, lower than the national average of 59.5%; with 66% of the males and 34% of females literate. 19% of the population is under 6 years of age. Bagaha is located on the bank of Gandak River and near the Valmiki Tiger Reserve.

Transportation 
Bagaha railway station is the main railway station of Bagaha and it is situated on Muzaffarpur–Gorakhpur main line under the Samastipur railway division of East Central Railway zone.
Other Main transportation by Road through NH 727. 
By road We can reach from Bagaha to Patna ,
Bagaha to Bettiah and Bagaha to Gorakhpur (U.P)
Public transport is available from 4:00 Am to 9:00 PM.

References

Cities and towns in West Champaran district